Accoutrements are the personal/individual equipment of service people such as soldiers, sailors, police and firemen and employees of some private organizations such as security guards, other than their basic uniform and weapons.

Accoutrements can be intended for field, garrison or ceremonial purposes. Most accoutrements for field use are purely practical in nature.

Ceremonial accoutrements may no longer have a practical purpose in modern operations but may be retained to maintain a tradition. Garrison accoutrements will vary in their usefulness and include both practical and ceremonial/traditional items.

Some accoutrements such as lanyards, have both a traditional/ceremonial and a practical purpose. In these cases a different item may be worn in garrison or ceremonial occasions than that used in the field. For example, in the Australian army different corps and units wear different coloured lanyards for service or ceremonial dress, but universally use drab natural fibre coloured lanyards for pistol retention in the field.

Sources of accoutrements
Accoutrements can be issued by the service or employer or obtained privately. Similarly, accoutrements can be commercially produced, government produced or commercially produced under government contract.

Informal names for accoutrements
The forces of various nations have or have had different names for the basic accoutrements issued to most or all soldiers, such as:
 TA-50 (US Army)
DP-1 (Australian Army) 
In some cases these common or informal names derive from the form number/name that the equipment issue to the individual is recorded on.

Unofficial use
Accoutrements are widely collected by militaria collectors and historical re-enactors. Some accoutrements used by re-enactors are reproductions, as the originals may no longer be available or too expensive or valuable to use.

Value
The accoutrements of the modern soldier may include equipment such as sophisticated electronics e.g. radios and night vision equipment and may be worth tens or in exceptional cases, e.g. some special forces soldiers, hundreds of thousands of dollars. In some cases, accoutrements are expendable or "written off" at the time of issue. Other items must be returned or otherwise accounted (e.g. covered by a loss or damage form) for when the individual leaves an organization.

Accoutrements on the private market for collectors can be valued at hundreds of thousands of dollars, depending on their rarity and/or provenance. For example, a relatively mundane item that can be proven to have belonged to a historically important figure may cost hundreds or thousands of times the cost of a similar item owned by a non historically significant user.

Examples

Examples of accoutrements include:
 webbing (load bearing equipment)
 body armour
 helmets
 backpacks
 whistles
 gas masks
 equipment for living in the field such as bedding, portable shelters
 rain or foul weather gear
 hand cuffs
 first aid kit
 spurs
 entrenching tools
 navigational equipment, such as compasses and protractors
 brassards - e.g. MP (military police) brassards

References 

Military equipment